The 1944 Vermont gubernatorial election took place on November 7, 1944. Incumbent Republican William H. Wills did not run for re-election to a third term as Governor of Vermont. Republican candidate Mortimer R. Proctor defeated Democratic candidate Ernest H. Bailey to succeed him.

Republican primary

Results

Democratic primary

Results

General election

Candidates
Mortimer R. Proctor, Lieutenant Governor of Vermont
Ernest H. Bailey

Results

References

Vermont
1944
Gubernatorial
November 1944 events